Kimberly Prause is an American voice actress and theatre actress. She has done several anime voice roles for ADV Films and Sentai Filmworks.

Voice roles
 Air - Kano's Mother
 Akame ga Kill! - Client (Ep. 2), Spear (Ep. 7)
 Angelic Layer - Chitose Tanaka
 Aquarian Age: Sign for Evolution - Arayashiki East
 BASToF Syndrome - Cora
 Best Student Council - Eiko Nagai, Eliza Yamamoto
 Comic Party Revolution - Aya Hasebe
 DN Angel - Riku Harada
 Girls und Panzer - Maho Nishizumi
 Gravion - Ayaka Shigure
 Kino's Journey - Sica
 Maburaho - Rin Kamishiro
 Mezzo DSA - Mao
 Mythical Detective Loki Ragnarok - Ayako Wada
 Najica Blitz Tactics - Shinobu Misato
 Princess Tutu - Lamp Spirit
 Saint Seiya - Shunrei
 Science Ninja Team Gatchaman (ADV dub) - Jun the Swan (G-3)
 Sister Princess - Dream Girl
 Super GALS! - Aya Hoshino
 Those Who Hunt Elves - Fake Mermaid, Nancy, Elven Hunter #3
 UFO Princess Valkyrie - Princess Chorus

References

External links
 Kim Prause at English Voice Actor & Production Staff Database

Living people
American voice actresses
American stage actresses
Year of birth missing (living people)
Place of birth missing (living people)
21st-century American women